George Richard James Hennessy, 1st Baron Windlesham, OBE (23 March 1877 – 8 October 1953) was a British soldier and Conservative politician.

Hennessy, a Franco-Irish aristocrat, served in the First World War as a Major in the King's Royal Rifle Corps and on the Staff of the 8th Division. In 1918 he was elected to parliament for Winchester, a seat he held until 1931, and served under Bonar Law and Baldwin as a Junior Lord of the Treasury from 1922 to 1924 and from 1924 to 1925, as Vice-Chamberlain of the Household from 1925 to 1928 and as Treasurer of the Household from 1928 to 1929. Hennessy held the latter position also from September to November 1931 in the National Government of Ramsay MacDonald. From 1931 to 1941 he was Vice-Chairman of the Conservative and Unionist Party. Hennessy was created a Baronet, of Windlesham in the County of Surrey, in 1927, and on 22 February 1937 he was raised to the peerage as Baron Windlesham, of Windlesham in Surrey.

Windlesham was born in France, the son of Richard Hennessy and Marthe (née Hennessy). His parents were first cousins, both from the Franco-Irish family of Cognac fame. His parents separated and his mother moved to England with her children. Marthe Hennessy eventually remarried in 1888 with James Sholto Douglas (1855–1891), youngest brother of the Marquess of Queensberry. 

Family ties with the French branches were maintained but economic interests in the cognac business were discontinued by family arrangement. Windlesham married Ethel Mary Wynter, daughter of Charles Reginald Wynter, in 1898. He died in October 1953, aged 76, and was succeeded in the baronetcy and barony by his eldest son, James Hennessy, a brigadier in the Grenadier Guards. The latter's son, David Hennessy, 3rd Baron Windlesham, was also a Conservative politician.

Arms

See also

 Ó hAonghusa

References

External links 
 

Windlesham, George Richard James Hennessy, 1st Baron
Windlesham, George Richard James Hennessy, 1st Baron
Barons Windlesham
Officers of the Order of the British Empire
Barons created by George VI
King's Royal Rifle Corps officers
Conservative Party (UK) MPs for English constituencies
UK MPs 1918–1922
UK MPs 1922–1923
UK MPs 1923–1924
UK MPs 1924–1929
UK MPs 1929–1931
UK MPs who were granted peerages
Treasurers of the Household
British Army personnel of World War I
20th-century Anglo-Irish people
Hennessy family